"I'm Feelin' U" is a 2007 song by the musician CeCe Peniston. The song was originally released in February on the partially mixed dance compilation Miami 2007, a part of Defected In The House series, that featured overall thirty-eight tracks by various artists and was issued on ITH Records.

In May 2007, "I'm Feelin' U" was released also on single on Soulfuric Recordings with four remixes, of which one was produced also by Ron Carroll. The rest three were mixed by DJ Fudge and Brian Tappert.

The title was available also in a digital format, as a virtual single for a direct download, and became the tenth most downloaded track of 2007 at Traxsource, an independent dance music digital downloads site in USA.

Credits and personnel
 CeCe Peniston – lead vocal, writer
 Ron Carroll – writer, remix, producer
 Stéphane Juif (aka DJ Fudge) – remix, arranger, producer
 Brian Tappert – remix, keyboards, drums, additional programming
 Matt Hennessy – engineer
 Rob "Diggy" Morrison – additional keyboards
 Alex Finkine – guitar
 Kris Anderson – recording vocals

Track listings
 12", US, #SFR 0033
 "I'm Feelin' U" (Ron Carroll's Original BMC Vocal) – 7:23
 "I'm Feelin' U" (B Room Dub) – 6:10
 "I'm Feelin' U" (Fudge Main Remix) – 6:17
 "I'm Feelin' U" (Subsonic Fudge Dub) – 5:56

 MD, US, #SFR0033
 MCD, US, TP, #SFR0033
 "I'm Feelin' U" (Ron Carroll's Original BMC Vocal) – 7:23
 "I'm Feelin' U" (Fudge Main Remix) – 6:17
 "I'm Feelin' U" (Subsonic Fudge Dub) – 5:56
 "I'm Feelin' U" (B Room Dub) – 6:10

References

General

 Specific

External links 
 

2007 singles
CeCe Peniston songs
Songs written by CeCe Peniston
Songs written by Ron Carroll
2007 songs